En Vivo: Desde la Plaza El Progrado en Guadalajara (Eng.: Live: From Plaza El Progreso en Guadalajara''') is the title of the second live album released by Mexican singer-songwriter Joan Sebastian. This album became his first number-one hit on the Billboard Top Latin Albums chart. En Vivo'' was nominated for a 2002 Lo Nuestro Award for Regional/Mexican Album of the Year.

Track listing
All songs written by Joan Sebastian, except where noted.
Juliantla — 0:50
Sembrador de Amor/Manantial (José Manuel Figueroa) — 4:08
Contigo O Sin Ti (José Manuel Figueroa) — 4:26
Hasta Que Amanezca/Esa Noche — 3:07
Veinticinco Rosas — 4:24
Tatuajes — 3:56
Gracias Por Tanto Amor — 3:24
El Toro — 4:09
Cincuenta Años — 3:45
El Primer Tonto — 3:46
Un Idiota — 4:08
Secreto de Amor — 5:26
Aunque Me Duela el Alma — 2:38
Como Tu Decidas (José Manuel Figueroa) — 3:02
Recuerdame Bonito — 3:10

Credits
This information from Allmusic.
Joan Sebastían: Harmonica, director, producer
Enrique Martinez: Accordion, keyboards, music direction
César Benítez: keyboards
David Bojorges: Operation
Alejandro Carballo: Trombone
Daniel Estevez: Engineer
Martin Flores: percussion, drums
Robert Incelli: Saxophone
Harry Kim: Trumpet
Margarita Luna: vocals
Rocío Marron: Violin
Francisco Miranda: Engineer
Fernando Roldán: Engineer
Ramon Stagnaro: Guitar acoustic and electric.
Enzo Villaparedes: Trumpet

Chart performance

Sales and certifications

References

Joan Sebastian live albums
2001 live albums
Live cumbia albums
Albums produced by Joan Sebastian
Spanish-language live albums